Oakes is the most populous city in Dickey County, North Dakota, United States. The population was 1,798 at the 2020 census. Oakes was founded in 1886.

History
Oakes was laid out in 1886. It was named for Thomas F. Oakes, a railroad official. A post office has been in operation in Oakes since 1886. The city was incorporated in 1888.

Geography

Oakes is located in southeastern North Dakota at  (46.137249, −98.089686). It sits approximately one mile east of the James river and is the meeting place of several rail lines. Because of its rail access, Oakes is home to several major grain elevators that handle large volumes of grain, primarily corn.

Demographics

2020 census

As of the 2020 census, there were 1,798 people, 849 households, and 510 families living in the city. The population density was 1152.56 inhabitants per square mile (445.01/km2). There were 875 housing units at an average density of 580.9 units per square mile (216.56/km2).

2010 census
As of the census of 2010, there were 1,856 people, 807 households, and 476 families living in the city. The racial makeup of the city was 96.1% White, 0.5% African American, 0.3% Native American, 0.8% Asian, 1.1% from other races, and 1.3% from two or more races. Hispanic or Latino of any race were 3.8% of the population.

There were 807 households, of which 26.8% had children under the age of 18 living with them, 51.2% were married couples living together, 4.5% had a female householder with no husband present, 3.3% had a male householder with no wife present, and 41.0% were non-families. 36.9% of all households were made up of individuals, and 19.4% had someone living alone who was 65 years of age or older. The average household size was 2.19 and the average family size was 2.89.

The median age in the city was 45.7 years. 23% of residents were under the age of 18; 6% were between the ages of 18 and 24; 20.2% were from 25 to 44; 26.7% were from 45 to 64; and 24.1% were 65 years of age or older. The gender makeup of the city was 48.1% male and 51.9% female.

2000 census
As of the census of 2000, there were 1,979 people, 828 households, and 495 families living in the city. The population density was 1,203.0 people per square mile (463.1/km). There were 908 housing units at an average density of 552.0 per square mile (212.5/km). The racial makeup of the city was 97.27% White, 0.20% Native American, 1.01% Asian, 1.01% from other races, and 0.51% from two or more races. Hispanic or Latino of any race were 2.58% of the population.

There were 828 households, out of which 27.7% had children under the age of 18 living with them, 51.2% were married couples living together, 5.2% had a female householder with no husband present, and 40.2% were non-families. 36.7% of all households were made up of individuals, and 20.0% had someone living alone who was 65 years of age or older. The average household size was 2.28 and the average family size was 3.02.

In the city, the population was spread out, with 24.8% under the age of 18, 6.6% from 18 to 24, 23.0% from 25 to 44, 21.0% from 45 to 64, and 24.5% who were 65 years of age or older. The median age was 42 years. For every 100 females, there were 93.5 males. For every 100 females age 18 and over, there were 87.2 males.

The median income for a household in the city was $30,263, and the median income for a family was $39,625. Males had a median income of $29,135 versus $15,611 for females.  The per capita income for the city was $17,138. About 6.3% of families and 8.8% of the population were below the poverty line, including 10.4% of those under age 18 and 11.0% of those age 65 or over.

Education

Oakes has two schools, including Oakes Public School and Oakes High School. Oakes Public School provides pre-school and grades K–6. Oakes High School provides grades 7–12. The athletic teams of Oakes High School are called the Tornadoes, replacing the old name the Golden Tornadoes. The current school colors are orange, black, and white.

Notable people

 Phil Hansen, defensive end with the Buffalo Bills
 Stuart Munsch, Admiral United States Navy

Local media

AM Radio

FM Radio

Parks

J. Paul Klinger Park
J. Paul Klinger Park is located just southwest of the pool. The park has a roofed shelter with seating and tables. Klinger Park also has a beach volleyball court a picnic area, and a playground that includes a slide, swings, tire swing, tunnel tubes, rock wall, and a rope wall.

Softball Complex
The Oakes softball complex has three softball diamonds, a playground, a two-hole Frisbee golf course, and a concessions stand.

Climate
This climatic region is typified by large seasonal temperature differences, with warm to hot (and often humid) summers and cold (sometimes severely cold) winters.  According to the Köppen Climate Classification system, Oakes has a humid continental climate, abbreviated "Dfb" on climate maps.

References

Cities in North Dakota
Cities in Dickey County, North Dakota
Populated places established in 1886
1886 establishments in Dakota Territory